Cacopsylla elegans is a species of bugs in the Psyllidae family, the jumping plant lice. It is found on Sorbus japonica in Japan.

References

External links 

 Cacopsylla elegans at catalogueoflife.org

Psyllidae
Hemiptera of Asia
Insects of Japan
Endemic fauna of Japan
Insects described in 2004